Charlotte di Calypso (born Charlotte Belliard, 17 April 1990) is a French fashion model, best known for winning the Elite Model Look in 2005 and being the face of the Chanel Chance perfume.

Early life
Charlotte di Calypso was born Charlotte Belliard in La Baule, France. In 2005, at the age of fifteen, she entered the French Elite Model Look and was chosen to move on to the international final in Shanghai. She won the competition, earning herself a contract with the prestigious Elite Model Management in Paris.

Career
After her win, Di Calypso debuted in fashion in September 2005, modeling for the Prada Spring 2006 collection. She then booked her first campaign, with Topshop. Her career was forged with her runway work, walking for top designers and fashion houses, like Chanel, Valentino, Yohji Yamamoto, Dolce & Gabbana, Jil Sander, Diane von Furstenberg, and Emanuel Ungaro. For the Spring 2009 haute couture season, she opened for Christian Dior, and also walked for Christian Lacroix, Chanel, Valentino, and Giorgio Armani She recently became the new face of Ralph Lauren, replacing longtime face Valentina Zelyaeva, alongside Japanese model Tao Okamoto.  She has appeared in advertisements for Gucci, Pucci, Ralph Lauren, Lacoste, Chanel, and Façonnable. Calypso was also featured in a spread of Vogue Paris, alongside other French models Sigrid Agren, Jennifer Messelier, Mélodie Dagault, Constance Jablonski, and Mathilde Julia Frachon, declaring France as the country to produce the next wave of supermodels, as other countries like Russia and Brazil had done before.  She has also appeared in editorials for French, Italian, Portuguese, and Japanese Vogue, Harpers Bazaar, Allure,  and Dazed & Confused.

References

External links
 
 
 
 

Living people
1990 births
French female models
Elite Model Management models